Emancipation is the nineteenth studio album by American recording artist Prince. It was released on November 19, 1996, by NPG Records and EMI Records as a triple album. The title refers to Prince's freedom from his contract with Warner Bros. Records after 18 years, with which he had a contentious relationship. The album was Prince's third to be released that year (along with Chaos and Disorder and the soundtrack album of the Spike Lee movie Girl 6), which made 1996 one of the most prolific years for material released by Prince.

Overview
Emancipation is something of a concept album, celebrating his release from Warner Bros. as well as his marriage to Mayte Garcia, who became his wife on Valentine's Day earlier that year. With his newfound freedom, Prince experimented more openly with varying genres, including house and blues. He also freely commented on his fame and dealings with Warner Bros. ("White Mansion", "Slave", "Face Down") while also returning slightly to the "computer" theme he explored a decade earlier ("Emale", "My Computer").

"Jam of the Year" is the opening song on the album. It features Prince singing in his falsetto range and Rosie Gaines on backing vocals. It later became the name of the tour for the album and a live version of the song was released as part of a single called "NYC Live" in 1997.

Prince wrote several songs and ballads dedicated to his wife, Mayte Garcia, and his unborn child, most of which appear on the second disc of the album. The child, born in October 1996 (about one month before the album's release), suffered from Pfeiffer syndrome type 2, a rare skull disease, and died shortly after birth. A recording of the child's heartbeat is featured as part of the percussion in the song, "Sex in the Summer".

"My Computer" is a collaboration with British art pop musician Kate Bush, featuring lyrics examining the burgeoning online dating scene and its implications on how romantic relationships can develop in the internet age. Prince previously collaborated with Bush on the song "Why Should I Love You", released on Bush's 1993 album The Red Shoes.

Emancipation marked the first album in Prince's career to include cover versions of songs written by other songwriters. He said that he had wanted to cover songs in the past, but was advised against it by Warner Bros. Four such covers appeared on the album: "Betcha by Golly Wow!" (previously a hit for the Stylistics), "I Can't Make You Love Me" (previously a hit for Bonnie Raitt), "La-La (Means I Love You)" (previously a hit for the Delfonics) retitled "La, La, La Means 👁 Love U", and "One of Us" (written by Eric Bazilian, and previously a hit for Joan Osborne). Notably, Prince changed the chorus of "One of Us" from "What if God was one of us / Just a slob like one of us" to "... Just a slave like one of us".

The album is notable for its format: it consists of three discs, each containing 12 songs with exactly 60 minutes per disc. Prince insinuated to the press at the time that the number of songs, discs and length of the album had a connection with the Egyptians and Egyptian pyramids.

Response
In the United States, the album debuted at number 11. Though not a major seller, it did sell over 500,000 copies. Being three discs, it was qualified to being certified double platinum (the RIAA certifies based on the number of discs sold - 3 disc set).

The subsequent Jam of the Year World Tour was a major success (though very few songs from Emancipation were included in the concerts and the vast majority of the album's tracks remained unperformed), resulting in a significant comeback for Prince after the commercial and critical disappointment of Chaos and Disorder from four months earlier.

Track listing
All tracks written by Prince except where noted.

Notes:
 Every use of the pronoun "I" throughout the song titles and liner notes is represented by a stylized "👁" symbol. This symbol is commonly transliterated as "eye" amongst Prince fans, as "👁 No" and "I Wish U Heaven" both appeared on Lovesexy.
 "Mr. Happy" contains a sample of "What Can I Do?" (1994) by Ice Cube.
 "Style" contains a sample of "Atomic Dog" (1982) by George Clinton.
 "Sleep Around" contains a sample of "Squib Cakes" (1974) by Tower of Power.

Personnel
 Prince – lead vocals and various instruments
 Mr. Hayes – keyboards (1–6, 2–10, 3–10), backing vocals (1–4)
 Tommy Barbarella – keyboards (1–6, 2–10, 3–10)
 Tom Burrell – additional keyboards (1–10)
 Joe Galdo – music programming
 Ricky Peterson – piano (2–1), additional keyboards (2–10)
 Kathleen Dyson – guitar (2–1, 2–4, 2–6, 3–11), backing vocals (1–4)
 Mike Scott – guitar (3–5)
 Rhonda Smith – bass (1–4, 1–7, 1–10, 2–1, 2–6), backing vocals (1–4)
 Sonny T. – bass (1–6, 2–10, 3–10)
 Michael B. – drums (1–6, 2–10, 3–10)
 Kirk Johnson – drums (unspecified tracks)
 Eric Leeds – saxophone and flute (1–1), saxophone (1–4,1–7, 1–10, 2–4, 2–6, 3–6)
 Walter Chancellor Jr. – saxophone (1–1, 3–6)
 Brian Gallagher – tenor saxophone (1–5, 1–9, 2–10, 3–7)
 Kathy Jensen – baritone saxophone (1–5, 1–9, 2–10, 3–7)
 Brian Lynch – trumpet (1–7, 2–4, 3–6)
 Steve Strand – trumpet (1–5, 1–9, 2–10, 3–7)
 Dave Jensen – trumpet (1–5, 1–9, 2–10, 3–7)
 Michael B. Nelson – trombone (1–5, 1–9, 2–10, 3–7)
 Rosie Gaines – backing vocals (1–1)
 Kathleen Bradford – backing vocals (2–12)
 Rhonda Johnson – backing vocals (2–12)
 Chanté Moore – backing vocals (3–5)
 Kate Bush – backing vocals (3–9)
 Mayte – Spanish spoken word (1–9), backing vocals (3–10) 
 Ninety-9 – vocal sample (1–2, 3–4), spoken word (2–7)
 Scrap D. – rap (1–11, 3–8)
 Michael Mac – scratches (2–7)
 Savion Glover – tap performance (2–7)

Singles and Hot 100 positions
 "Betcha by Golly Wow!" (#31 US Airplay, #10 US R&B Airplay, #11 UK, #20 Australia)
 "Betcha by Golly Wow!"
 "Right Back Here in My Arms"
 "The Holy River" (UK CD 1) (#58 US Airplay, #19 UK)
 "The Holy River" (radio edit)
 "Somebody's Somebody" (edit)
 "Somebody's Somebody" (live studio mix)
 "Somebody's Somebody" (Ultrafantasy edit)
 "Somebody's Somebody" (promo CD) (#15 US R&B Airplay, #19 UK)
 "Somebody's Somebody" (radio edit)
 "Somebody's Somebody" (album version)

Charts

Weekly charts

Year-end charts

Certifications

References

1996 albums
Prince (musician) albums
Albums produced by Prince (musician)
NPG Records albums
EMI Records albums